"Mr. Perfectly Fine" is a song written and recorded by American singer-songwriter Taylor Swift for her first re-recorded album, Fearless (Taylor's Version) (2021), a re-recording of her 2008 album. Produced by Swift and Jack Antonoff, the track is a country pop and pop rock song with lyrics about the tumultuous feelings after a derailed romantic relationship, using extensive antonomasia and wordplay. Music critics picked it as an album highlight, deeming its lyrics witty and the production catchy.

"Mr. Perfectly Fine" was released for download and streaming without prior promotion on April 7, 2021, via Republic Records. It is one of the six unreleased "From the Vault" tracks on Fearless (Taylor's Version). "Mr. Perfectly Fine" peaked at number 30 on the US Billboard Hot 100 and number two on the Hot Country Songs chart. The song also reached the top 30 of charts in Australia, Canada, Ireland, New Zealand, Singapore, and the United Kingdom. Its release was accompanied by a lyric video released to Swift's YouTube channel.

Background and release

On February 11, 2021, following the dispute regarding the rights to the masters of her first six studio albums, Taylor Swift announced that the first of her re-recorded albums, Fearless (Taylor's Version), a re-recording of Swift's 2008 album Fearless, would be released on April 9, 2021. Alongside the announcement, Swift revealed she would release six songs, all dubbed "from the Vault" that did not make the 2008 album or the 2009 reissue. Swift explained several reasons for the scrapping of the tracks, including not wanting too many breakup or down-tempo songs on the album, and the limitations of how many songs could fit on CDs in 2008. In her announcement of the album, Swift wrote "I've decided I want you to have the whole story. See the entire vivid picture, and let you into the entire dreamscape that is my Fearless album." Swift originally wrote "Mr. Perfectly Fine" in 2008.

On April 2, Swift uploaded a cryptic, golden-hued video to her social media accounts depicting a vault releasing scrambled words from it. Fans and news outlets decoded the scrambled letters to reveal the titles of the vault tracks. Swift uploaded the official track list to her social media accounts, including the names of the five remaining "from the Vault" tracks, the next day. On April 7, Swift surprise-released "Mr. Perfectly Fine" alongside a lyric video. In the video, the lyrics appear over a man in a tuxedo enveloped in fog. "Mr. Perfectly Fine" was also included in Fearless (Taylor's Version): The Halfway Out the Door Chapter and Fearless (Taylor's Version): The From the Vault Chapter, streaming compilations released on May 13, 2021, and May 26, 2021, respectively, each featuring five other songs from Fearless (Taylor's Version).

Composition and lyrics

"Mr. Perfectly Fine" is a midtempo country pop and pop rock song song with elements of rock and rock and roll. It runs for four minutes and 38 seconds. Musically, the song is set in the key of D major with a tempo of 136 beats per minute (BPM). Swift's vocals span from G3 to D5. Lyrically, Swift navigates the tumultuous feelings surrounding breakup compared to her "perfectly fine" estranged lover, using wordplay. The first verse recalls the seemingly perfect relationship, narrating "a man who says all the rights things at the right time" before progressing into the chorus, which describes the turbulent emotions Swift faced while the subject remains unscathed. Several media outlets and fans alike pointed out the lyric "Mr. casually cruel", resembling the lyric "So casually cruel in the name of being honest" in Swift's song "All Too Well" from Red (2012).

Critical reception
"Mr. Perfectly Fine" received acclaim from music critics. Vulture Zoey Haylock wrote that "Mr. Perfectly Fine" brings back memories of "your high-school heartbreak", boasting a "classic T-Swift bridge and a final, soaring chorus". Haylock dubbed the song "a 2008 time capsule" and praising the "magic and curiosity" reminiscent of the original Fearless. Similarly, Madeline Crone of American Songwriter applauded the collaboration with Jack Antonoff as "breath[ing] life into a new classic" and recalled the "age-old feelings" its country-pop production provokes. Crone opined that "Mr. Perfectly Fine" reflects the skill that paved the way for the sophistication of her indie folk record Folklore and alternative rock Evermore (both 2020). Writing for Rolling Stone, Claire Shaffer noted Swift's "clever wordplay", and described its sound as "a classic Swift mix of country and pop with an added rock edge". Jess Cohen of E! News opined that the lyrics "don't disappoint".

Billboard critic Gil Kaufman defined it as a "dreamy, mid-tempo acoustic track" and a "classic Fearless-era Taylor tale of romantic woe". He also pinpointed the wordplay—where Swift dubs the subject as "Mr. perfect face," "Mr. here to stay", "Mr. looked me in the eye and told me you would never go away", and "Mr. change of heart", painting a "portrait of a man who says all the rights things at the right time". Kitty Empire of The Guardian similarly described it as a "stone cold classic Swift song" and praised its blend of the "brighter, more direct songcraft" of the Fearless era and the more subdued production of Folklore. Alexis Petridis, also of The Guardian, highlighted the "relish" in Swift's voice expressed a satisfaction that mitigates her anger. Billboard's Jason Lipshutz ranked it as the second-best of the six Vault songs, praising the back-to-back references to "All Too Well" from Red (2012) and "Dear John" from Speak Now (2010) as "pay[ing] homage to her grandest breakup songs." In Hannah Mylrea's review of the album published in NME, she identified "Mr. Perfectly Fine" as a standout, "stuffed with swooning melodies and typically Swiftian lyrics."  Dani Blum's Pitchfork review of Fearless (Taylor's Version) pointed to "Mr. Perfectly Fine" as a "delightful, strumming takedown" and a highlight among the Vault tracks.

In Billboard's ranking of the 50 best songs of 2021 so far, "Mr. Perfectly Fine" placed 46th, with critics from the magazine applauding its lyrics and describing the song as "vintage Taylor Swift that still feels fresh in 2021."

Accolade

Commercial performance

"Mr. Perfectly Fine" debuted at number one on the Billboard Country Digital Song Sales chart dated April 17, 2021, marking Swift's 17th number one entry on the chart and replacing Swift's own "You All Over Me" from the top spot. Upon the release of Fearless (Taylor's Version), "Mr. Perfectly Fine" skyrocketed to number two on the Billboard Hot Country Songs chart from its debut at twenty, scoring Swift her 26th top-10 entry on the chart. The song drew 14.2 million streams in the US and topped Billboard Country Streaming Songs chart, marking Swift's fifth chart-topper. On the all-genre Billboard Hot 100, "Mr. Perfectly Fine" rose to number 30 from its debut of number 90, becoming Swift's 80th entry inside the top 40 of the chart, extending Swift's record for the most top-40 entries among women. It debuted at number 78 on the Rolling Stone Top 100, a competitor to the Hot 100, collecting 4.4 million streams and selling 42,700 units in less than two days of tracking. In the next week, following the release of Fearless (Taylor's Version), the song jumped to number 11, selling 106,800 units and garnering 12.7 million streams.

On the Canadian Hot 100, "Mr. Perfectly Fine" debuted at 82 on the issue dated April 17, 2021, and rose to number 23 in the next week, ultimately spending 4 weeks on the chart. Similarly, on the Billboard Global 200, it jumped from its debut of number 114 to its peak of number 19. It debuted at number 11 in Singapore, 15 in Ireland, 19 in Australia, 24 in Belgium, 25 in New Zealand, and 30 in the United Kingdom.

Credits and personnel
Credits adapted from Tidal.

 Taylor Swift – vocals, songwriting, production
 Jack Antonoff – production, acoustic guitar, backing vocals, bass, electric guitar, keyboards, percussion, programming, recording, synthesizer
 Mikey Freedom Hart – 12-string acoustic guitar, electric guitar, guitar, pedal steel
 Sean Hutchinson – drums
 Michael Riddleberger – percussion
 Evan Smith – saxophones, synthesizer
 Randy Merrill – mastering
 Serban Ghenea – mixing
 John Hanes – engineering
 Laura Sisk – recording
 John Rooney – assistant recording
 Jon Sher – assistant recording
 Christopher Rowe – vocal engineering

Charts

Weekly charts

Year-end charts

Release history

Notes

References

2008 songs
2021 singles
Song recordings produced by Jack Antonoff
American pop rock songs
Song recordings produced by Taylor Swift
Songs written by Taylor Swift
Taylor Swift songs
Republic Records singles
Country pop songs